The 2021 Homecoming was a professional wrestling event produced by Impact Wrestling. It was taped on July 18 and 19, 2021 and aired exclusively on Impact Plus on July 31, 2021. It was held at Skyway Studios in Nashville, Tennessee. It was the second event under the Homecoming chronology and the first to be held since the 2019 event.

10 matches were contested at the event. In the main event, Eddie Edwards defeated W. Morrissey in a hardcore match. In other prominent matches, Matthew Rehwoldt (who made his Impact debut at the event) and Deonna Purrazzo won the Homecoming tournament by defeating Decay (Crazzy Steve and Rosemary) in the final, and Josh Alexander defeated Black Taurus to retain the Impact X Division Championship.

Production 
On June 30, 2021, Impact Wrestling announced that they will be hosting tapings of Impact! on July 18 and July 19, 2021. These tapings also featured matches for the Homecoming event.

Storylines 
The event featured professional wrestling matches that involved different wrestlers from pre-existing scripted feuds and storylines. Wrestlers portrayed heroes, villains, or less distinguishable characters in scripted events that built tension and culminated in a wrestling match or series of matches. Storylines were produced on Impact's weekly television program.

A key feature of the event was the Homecoming Tournament with Intergender tag team matches, featuring mixed tag teams competing to be crowned the Homecoming King and Queen. The following teams participated in the tournament:
Matt Cardona and Chelsea Green
Decay (Crazzy Steve and Rosemary)
The Pump Family (Petey Williams and Jordynne Grace)
The Road Warriors (Tommy Dreamer and Rachael Ellering)
Brian Myers and Missy Hyatt
Matthew Rehwoldt and Deonna Purrazzo
Swinger's Palace (Hernandez and Alisha Edwards)
Fallah 'N Flava (Fallah Bahh and Tasha Steelz)

On the July 1 episode of Impact!, Eddie Edwards was attacked in the parking lot by W. Morrissey before his match with Satoshi Kojima. This prompted Edwards to challenge Morrissey to a match at Slammiversary, which he lost after Morrissey hit Edwards with a chain-wrapped fist. On the next Impact!, Edwards and Morrissey brawled in the parking lot, resulting in the pair being matched up in a hardcore match at Homecoming.

Results

Homecoming Intergender Tag Team Tournament

References

External links 
 

2021 Impact Plus Monthly Special events
2021 in professional wrestling
2021 in Tennessee
Events in Nashville, Tennessee
July 2021 events in the United States
Professional wrestling in Nashville, Tennessee